Mocquard's worm snake (Madatyphlops decorsei) is a species of snake in the family Typhlopidae. The species is native to Africa.

Etymology
The specific name, decorsei, is in honor of French army doctor Gaston-Jules Decorse (1873-1907).

Geographic range
M. decorsei is endemic to Madagascar.

Habitat

Behavior
M. decorsei is mainly fossorial, but sometimes is active above ground.

Reproduction
M. decorsei is oviparous.

References

Further reading
Glaw F, Vences M (2006). A Field Guide to Amphibians and Reptiles of Madagascar, Third Edition. Cologne, Germany: Vences & Glaw Verlag. 496 pp. .
Hedges SB, Marion AB, Lipp KM, Marin J, Vidal N (2014). "A taxonomic framework for typhlopid snakes from the Caribbean and other regions (Reptilia, Squamata)". Caribbean Herpetology (49): 1-61. (Madatyphlops decorsei, new combination).
Mocquard F (1901). "Note préliminaire sur une collection de Reptiles et de Batraciens recueillis par M. Alluad dans le sud de Madagascar ". Bulletin du Muséum d'Histoire naturelle 7: 251–256. (Typhlops decorsei, new species, p. 255). (in French).

Madatyphlops
Snakes of Africa
Reptiles of Madagascar
Endemic fauna of Madagascar
Taxa named by François Mocquard
Reptiles described in 1901